The 2015–16 season is UD Las Palmas's 32nd season in top-tier, after promotion from La liga 2 the previous season.

Current squad
''The numbers are established according to the official website:www.udlaspalmas.es and www.lfp.es

Youth players

Out on loan

Competitions

Overall

Overview

La Liga

League table

Results summary

Result round by round

Matches

See also
 2015–16 La Liga

References

External links
Club's official website

UD Las Palmas seasons
UD Las Palmas